Neoblattella detersa is a species of cockroach in the family Ectobiidae. It is found in North America, and the Caribbean.

References

Cockroaches
Articles created by Qbugbot
Insects described in 1868